The following is a list of border crossing points in France (or ) forming the external border of the Schengen Area. By contrast, the term points de passages autorisés refers to the crossing points at the border between France and other Schengen countries (i.e. internal borders of the Schengen Area).

At the main border crossing points that receive traffic from outside the Schengen Area, the Police aux Frontières carries out immigration checks, whilst Customs are responsible for customs checks. At smaller regional border crossing points that receive limited traffic from outside the Schengen Area, Customs are responsible for carrying out both immigration and customs checks.

PARAFE self-service gates have been installed at a number of border crossing points to facilitate passage for eligible travellers (European Economic Area, Andorran, Monegasque, San Marinese and Swiss biometric passport holders aged 18 or over).

Air borders

Land borders

Metropolitan France's only land border with a non-Schengen country is with Andorra, while the Channel Tunnel forms a railway link with the United Kingdom. The overseas departments and territories of France are not part of the Schengen Area. French Guiana borders Brazil and Suriname, whereas Saint-Martin borders Sint Maarten.

In the 1991 Sangatte Protocol, France signed an agreement with the United Kingdom to introduce 'juxtaposed controls' (in French, des bureaux de contrôles nationaux juxtaposés, or 'BCNJ') at Eurostar and Eurotunnel stations.

This means that, when travelling from the UK to France by Eurostar, French immigration checks are carried out by the Police aux Frontières on British soil before boarding the train, whilst French customs checks take place upon arrival on French soil. When travelling in the reverse direction from France to the UK by Eurostar, French immigration exit checks and British immigration checks both take place on French soil before boarding the train, whilst British customs checks take place upon arrival on British soil. The exception is at Marne-la-Vallée–Chessy, where the UK Border Force no longer maintains a full presence and passengers boarding the Eurostar there clear immigration and customs on arrival in the UK.

When travelling from the UK to France by Eurotunnel, French immigration and customs checks both take place on British soil before boarding the train. When travelling from France to the UK by Eurotunnel, after French immigration exit checks, British immigration and customs checks both take place on French soil before boarding the train shuttle.

Maritime borders
In 2003, France signed an agreement with the United Kingdom to introduce 'juxtaposed controls' (in French, des bureaux de contrôles nationaux juxtaposés, or 'BCNJ') at Dover on the British side and at Calais, Dunkirk and Boulogne-sur-Mer on the French side.

This means that, when travelling from Dover to France by ferry, French immigration checks are carried out by the Police aux Frontières on British soil before boarding the ferry, whilst French customs checks take place upon arrival on French soil. When travelling in the reverse direction from Calais, Dunkirk and Boulogne-sur-Mer in France to the UK by ferry, French immigration exit checks and British immigration checks both take place on French soil before boarding the ferry, whilst British customs checks take place upon arrival on British soil.

References

External links
Official Journal of the European Union: Update of the list of border crossing points
List of air borders

Border crossings of France
Law enforcement in Europe
Transport and the European Union